Xiao Kun (born 15 February 1995) is a Chinese footballer currently playing as a midfielder for Sichuan Jiuniu.

Career statistics

Club
.

References

1995 births
Living people
Footballers from Hunan
Chinese footballers
Association football midfielders
China League Two players
China League One players
Suzhou Dongwu F.C. players
Shanghai Port F.C. players
Sichuan Jiuniu F.C. players